In Greek mythology, Ganymede or Ganymedes (Ancient Greek: Γανυμήδης Ganymēdēs) is a divine hero whose homeland was Troy. Homer describes Ganymede as the most beautiful of mortals and tells the story of how he was abducted by the gods to serve as Zeus's cup-bearer in Olympus.

The myth was a model for the Greek social custom of paiderastía, the romantic relationship between an adult male and an adolescent male. The Latin form of the name was Catamitus (and also "Ganymedes"), from which the English word catamite is derived. Socrates says that Zeus was in love with Ganymede, called "desire" in Plato's Phaedrus.  According to Plato's Laws, the Cretans were regularly accused of inventing the myth because they wanted to justify their unnatural pleasures.

Family 
In Greek Mythology, Ganymede is the son of Tros of Dardania, from whose name "Troy" is supposedly derived, either by his wife Callirrhoe, daughter of the river god Scamander, or Acallaris, daughter of Eumedes. Depending on the author, he is the brother of Ilus, Assaracus, Cleopatra or Cleomestra.

The stories about Ganymede, however, differ greatly in their detail, for some called him a son of Laomedon, others a son of Ilus. In some versions he is known as Dardanus, in others as Erichthonius or Assaracus.

Mythology

Ganymede was abducted by Zeus from Mount Ida near Troy in Phrygia. Ganymede had been tending sheep, a rustic or humble pursuit characteristic of a hero's boyhood before his privileged status is revealed, when an eagle transported the youth to Mount Olympus. The bird is sometimes described as being under the command of Zeus and sometimes as being the god transformed.

On Olympus, Zeus granted Ganymede eternal youth and immortality as the official cup bearer to the gods, in place of Hebe, relieved of cup-bearing duties upon her marriage to Herakles. Alternatively, the Iliad presented Hebe (and at one instance, Hephaestus) as the cup bearer of the gods with Ganymede acting as Zeus's personal cup bearer. Edmund Veckenstedt associated Ganymede with the creation of  mead, which had a traditional origin in Phrygia. In various literature such as the Aeneid, Hera, Zeus's wife, regards Ganymede as a rival for her husband's affection. In various stories, Zeus later put Ganymede in the sky as the constellation Aquarius (the "water-carrier" or "cup-carrier"), which is adjacent to Aquila (the Eagle). In recognition of the myth, the largest moon of the planet Jupiter (named after Zeus's Roman counterpart) was named Ganymede by the German astronomer Simon Marius.

In the Iliad, Zeus is said to have compensated Ganymede's father Tros with the gift of fine horses, "the same that carry the immortals", delivered by the messenger god Hermes. Tros was consoled that his son was now immortal and would be the cupbearer for the gods, a position of much distinction.

Plato accounts for the pederastic aspect of the myth by attributing its origin to Crete, where the social custom of paiderastía was supposed to have originated (see "Cretan pederasty"). Athenaeus recorded a version of the myth where Ganymede was abducted by the legendary King Minos to serve as his cup-bearer instead of Zeus. Some authors have equated this version of the myth to Cretan pederasty practices, as recorded by Strabo and Ephoros, which involved abduction of a youth by an older lover for a period of two months before the youth was able to re-enter society as a man. Xenophon portrays Socrates denying that Ganymede was the catamite of Zeus, instead asserting that the god loved him for his psychē, "mind" or "soul," giving the etymology of his name as ganu- "taking pleasure" and mēd- "mind." Xenophon's Socrates points out that Zeus did not grant any of his lovers immortality, but that he did grant immortality to Ganymede.

In poetry, Ganymede became a symbol for the beautiful young male who attracted homosexual desire and love. He is not always portrayed as acquiescent. However, in the Argonautica of Apollonius of Rhodes, Ganymede is furious at the god Eros for having cheated him at the game of chance played with knucklebones, and Aphrodite scolds her son for "cheating a beginner". The Augustan poet Virgil portrays the abduction with pathos: the boy's aged tutors try in vain to draw him back to Earth, and his hounds bay uselessly at the sky. The loyal hounds left calling after their abducted master is a frequent motif in visual depictions and is referenced by Statius:

Here the Phrygian hunter is borne aloft on tawny wings, Gargara’s range sinks downwards as he rises, and Troy grows dim beneath him; sadly stand his comrades; vainly the hounds weary their throats with barking, pursue his shadow or bay at the clouds.

In the arts

Ancient visual arts

In 5th-century Athens, the story of Ganymede became popular among vase-painters, which was suited to the all-male symposium. Ganymede was usually depicted as a muscular young man, although Greek and Roman sculpture typically depicted his physique as less developed than athletes'.

One of the earliest depictions of Ganymede is a red-figure krater by the Berlin Painter in the Musée du Louvre. Zeus pursues Ganymede on one side, while the youth runs away on the other side, rolling along a hoop while holding aloft a crowing cock. The Ganymede myth was depicted in recognizable contemporary terms, illustrated with common behavior of homoerotic courtship rituals, as on a vase by the "Achilles Painter" where Ganymede also flees with a cock. Cocks were common gifts from older male suitors to younger men they were interested in romantically in 5th century Athens. Leochares (c. 350 BCE), a Greek sculptor of Athens who was engaged with Scopas on the Mausoleum at Halicarnassus cast a lost bronze group of Ganymede and the Eagle, a work that was held remarkable for its ingenious composition. It is apparently copied in a well-known marble group in the Vatican. Such Hellenistic gravity-defying feats were influential in the sculpture of the Baroque.

Ganymede and Zeus in the guise of an eagle were a popular subject on Roman funerary monuments with at least 16 sarcophagi depicting this scene.

Renaissance and Baroque
Ganymede was a major symbol of homosexual love in the visual and literary arts from the Renaissance to the Late Victorian era, until when Antinous, the reported lover of the Roman Emperor Hadrian, became a more popular subject.

In Shakespeare's As You Like It (1599), a comedy about misunderstandings in the magical setting of the Forest of Arden, Celia, dressed as a shepherdess, becomes "Aliena" (Latin "stranger", Ganymede's sister) and Rosalind, because she is "more than common tall", dresses up as a boy, Ganymede, a well-known image to the audience. She plays on her ambiguous charm to seduce Orlando, but also (inadvertently) the shepherdess Phoebe. Thus behind the conventions of Elizabethan theater in its original setting, the young boy played the girl Rosalind who dresses up as a boy and is then courted by another boy playing Phoebe. Ganymede also appears in the opening of Christopher Marlowe's play Dido, Queen of Carthage, where his and Zeus's affectionate banter is interrupted by an angry Aphrodite (Venus). In the later Jacobean tragedy Women Beware Women by Thomas Middleton, Ganymede, Hebe, and Hymen briefly appear to serve as cup bearers to the court, one of which has been poisoned in an assassination attempt, although the plan goes awry.

Allusions to Ganymede occur with some frequency in 17th-century Spanish theater. In El castigo sin venganza (1631) by Lope de Vega, Federico, the son of the Duke of Mantua, rescues Casandra, his future stepmother, and the pair will later develop an incestuous relationship. To emphasize the non-normative relation, the work includes a long passage, possibly an ekphrasis derived from Italian art, in which Jupiter in the form of an eagle abducts Ganymede. Two plays by Tirso de Molina, and in particular La prudencia en la mujer, include intriguing references to Ganymede. In this particular play, a Jewish doctor who seeks to poison the future king, carries a cup which is compared to Ganymede's.

One of the earliest surviving non-ancient depictions of Ganymede is a woodcut from the first edition of Emblemata (c. 1531), which shows the youth riding the eagle as opposed to being carried away. However, this composition is uncommon, with only sketches by Michelangelo that survived depicting Ganymede being carried. The painter-architect Baldassare Peruzzi included a panel of The Rape of Ganymede in a ceiling at the Villa Farnesina, Rome, (c. 1509–1514), with Ganymede's long blond hair and girlish pose making him identifiable at first glance, grasping the eagle's wing without resistance. In Antonio Allegri Correggio's Ganymede Abducted by the Eagle (Vienna) Ganymede's grasp is more intimate. Rubens painted two well-known versions, the earlier dating to 1611–1612 (Fürstlich Schwarzenbergische Kunststiftung, on permanent loan to the Liechtenstein Museum) portrays the young Ganymede in the embrace of the eagle being handed his cup while a later version dating to 1636–1638 painted for the Spanish king's hunting lodge (Museo del Prado) shows the young many being swept up violently by the eagle. Johann Wilhelm Baur portrays a full-grown Ganymede confidently riding the eagle towards Olympus in Ganymede Triumphant (c. 1640s). On the other hand, when Rembrandt painted The Rape of Ganymede for a Dutch Calvinist patron in 1635, a dark eagle carries aloft a plump cherubic baby (Paintings Gallery, Dresden) who is bawling and urinating in fright. A 1685 statue of Ganymede and Zeus entitled Ganymède Médicis by Pierre Laviron stands in the gardens of Versailles.

Examples of Ganymede in 18th-century France have been studied by Michael Preston Worley. The image of Ganymede was always that of a naive adolescent accompanied by an eagle and the homoerotic aspects of the legend were rarely dealt with. In fact, the story was often more sexualized. The Neoplatonic interpretation of the myth, also common in the Italian Renaissance, the rape of Ganymede, represented the ascent to spiritual perfection. These however seemed to be of no interest to Enlightenment philosophers and mythographers. Jean-Baptiste Marie Pierre, Charles-Joseph Natoire, Guillaume II Coustou, Pierre Julien, Jean-Baptiste Regnault and others contributed images of Ganymede to French art during this period.

Gallery

Modern

José Álvarez Cubero's sculpture of Ganymede, executed in Paris in 1804, brought the Spanish sculptor immediate recognition as one of the leading sculptors of his day.
Vollmer's Wörterbuch der Mythologie aller Völker, (Stuttgart, 1874) illustrates "Ganymede" by an engraving of a "Roman relief", showing a seated bearded Zeus who holds the cup aside to draw a naked Ganymede into his embrace. That engraving however was nothing but a copy of Raphael Mengs's counterfeit Roman fresco, painted as a practical joke on the eighteenth-century art critic Johann Winckelmann who was growing desperate in his search for homoerotic Greek and Roman antiquities. This story is very briefly told by Goethe in his Italienische Reise.
At Chatsworth in the nineteenth century the bachelor Duke of Devonshire added to his sculpture gallery Adamo Tadolini's Neoclassic "Ganymede and the Eagle", in which a luxuriously reclining Ganymede, embraced by one wing, prepares to exchange a peck with the eagle. The delicate cup in his hand is made of gilt-bronze, lending an unsettling immediacy and realism to the white marble group.
In the early years of the twentieth century, the topos of Ganymede's abduction by Zeus was drafted into the service of commercial enterprise. Adapting an 1892 lithograph by Frank Kirchbach, the brewery of Anheuser-Busch launched in 1904 an ad campaign publicizing the successes of Budweiser beer. Collectibles featuring the graphics of the poster continued to be produced into the early 1990s.
The poem “Ganymed”  by Goethe was set to music by Franz Schubert in 1817; published in his Opus 19, no. 3 (D. 544). Also set by Hugo Wolf.
The Portuguese sculptor António Fernandes de Sá represented the abduction of Ganymede in 1898. The sculpture can be found in Jardim da Cordoaria, in Porto (Portugal).
In stories by P. G. Wodehouse, the Junior Ganymede is a servants' club, analogous to the Drones, to which Jeeves belongs. Wodehouse named it after Ganymede presumably in reference to his role of cup-bearer.
Ganymede is a reluctant music fan in Kurtis Blow's 1980 song "Way Out West". After hours of rap by "The Stranger" (Kurtis), he eventually gets up to dance.
American artist Henry Oliver Walker painted a mural in the Library of Congress in Washington D.C. c. 1900, depicting an adolescent, nude Ganymede on the back of an eagle.
Ganymede and the god Dionysus make an appearance in Everworld VI: Fear the Fantastic, of K.A. Applegate's fantasy series Everworld. Ganymede is described as attracting both males and females.

My first thought, my first flash was that it was a beautiful woman.... The angel was beautiful, with a face dominated by immense, lustrous green eyes and framed by golden ringlets, and with a bow mouth and full lips and brilliant white teeth.And only then, only after I had felt that first rush of improbable carnal lust, did it occur to me that this angel was a man.

In 1959 Robert Rauschenberg referenced the myth in one of his best-known works, Canyon and in another work, Pail for Ganymede. In "Canyon", a photo of Rauschenberg's son Christopher beautifully reiterates the infant portrayed by Rembrandt in the 17th century. A stuffed eagle emerges from the flat picture plane with a pillow tied to a piece of string very near his claw. The pillow also reflects upon the young boy's body and Rembrandt's painting.
 Ganymede is a reluctant son in W. H. Auden's poem of that name, but he adores the eagle which teaches him how to kill.
Felice Picano's 1981 novel An Asian Minor reinvents the story of Ganymede.
In the 2016 video game Overwatch, the character Bastion has a bird named Ganymede.
A character in the Terra Ignota series by Ada Palmer is named Ganymede de la Trémoille
The opening of Will Self's 2017 novel Phone refers to 'agents of Ganymede' (p. 6) to explore caution within the homosexual community in previous decades.
The first poem in Jericho Brown's Pulitzer Prize for Poetry-winning 2019 book The Tradition is titled "Ganymede". Brown, who frequently interrogates topics of sexuality and race, brings the Greek abduction myth into contact with the history of American slavery.

Family tree

Notes

References

Sources

Ancient sources
Ganymede is named by various ancient Greek and Roman authors:

Homer – Iliad 5.265; Iliad 20.232;
Homerica – The Little Iliad, Frag 7;
Homeric Hymns – Hymn V, To Aphrodite, 203–217;
Theognis – Fragments 1.1345;
Pindar – Olympian Odes 1; 11;
Euripides – Iphigenia at Aulis 1051;
Plato – Phaedrus 255; Laws 636c
Apollonios Rhodios – Argonautica 3.112f;
ps-Apollodorus – Bibliotheke 2.104; 3.141;
Strabo – Geography 13.1.11;
Pausanias – Guide to Greece V.24.5; V.26.2–3;
Diodorus Siculus – The Library of History 4.75.3;
Hyginus
Fabulae 89; 224; 271;
Astronomica 2.16; 2.29;
Ovid – Metamorphoses 10.152;
Virgil – Aeneid 1.28; 5.252;
Cicero – De Natura Deorum 1.40;
Valerius Flaccus – Argonautica 2.414; 5.690;
Statius
Thebaid 1.549;
Silvae 3.4.13;
Apuleius – The Golden Ass 6.15; 6.24;
Quintus Smyrnaeus – Fall of Troy 8.427; 14.324;
Nonnus – Dionysiaca 8.93; 10.258; 10.308; 12.39; 14.430; 15.279; 17.76; 19.158; 25.430; 27.241; 31.252; 33.74; 39.67; 47.98;
Suda – Ilion; Minos;

Modern sources

External links

World History of Male Love: Zeus and Ganymede
The Zeus and Ganymede Myth: Analysis and Resources by Andrew Calimach
Ganymedes, Theoi Project
Ganymede: Subject of the Visual Arts
Goethe, "Ganymed"  
Warburg Institute Iconographic Database (c. 200 images of Ganymede) 

Greek mythological heroes
Cup-bearers
Consorts of Greek gods
Mythological rape victims
Princes in Greek mythology
Trojans
Metamorphoses characters
Olympian deities
LGBT themes in Greek mythology
 
Deeds of Zeus
Deeds of Eros